Ellesmere Port Gunners were an English speedway team in Ellesmere Port, Wirral, which operated at the Ellesmere Port Stadium from 1972 until their closure in 1985.

History
The inaugural league season for the team was during the 1972 British League Division Two season in which they finished in 15th place. The first track record on the 424 yard track was 76.0 seconds, set by John Jackson on 2 May 1972. The team continued to operate from 1972 until 1982 continuously competing in Division Two for 11 years, with a best place finish of 2nd in 1976.

A rider died on the Ellesmere Port track on 3 December 1977. Stuart Shirley lost his life on a Saturday morning training school after a collision.

The club was resurrected for one season in 1985 and went on to win the title during the 1985 National League season. They won the title after beating Poole Pirates and Middlesbrough Tigers by just one point. The team also reached the final of the Knockout Cup but lost to Eastbourne Eagles. The eventual track record went twice on the same night during the Knock-Out Cup Final 1st-leg. Gordon Kennett of Eastbourne clocked 69.2 only to be beaten by The Gunners Louis Carr in the very next heat with a time of 69.1. 

The speedway track was replaced by a greyhound racing track in late 1987.

Notable riders
 
Louis Carr
Phil Collins
Graham Drury
Steve Finch
Colin Goad
John Jackson
Dave Morton
Joe Owen
Chris Turner
Paul Tyrer
David Walsh

Season summary

References

Defunct British speedway teams
Sport in Ellesmere Port